Saint-Éloy-la-Glacière is a commune in the Puy-de-Dôme department in Auvergne in central France. It is a member commune of the Parc naturel régional Livradois-Forez.

Geography

The commune Saint-Éloy-la-Glacière contains the following localities: Les Amouillaux, Le Bourg, La Faye (shared with the commune of Échandelys), Le Griffol, Montgheol, Montgrain, Le Redondet, Sagne Neyre, Les Salles and La Vaisse (shared with the commune of Auzelles).

It borders on the following communes, clockwise from the north:
Auzelles
Saint-Amant-Roche-Savine
Fournols
Échandelys

Population history

See also
Communes of the Puy-de-Dôme department

References

Sainteloylaglaciere